= Speed limits in Belarus =

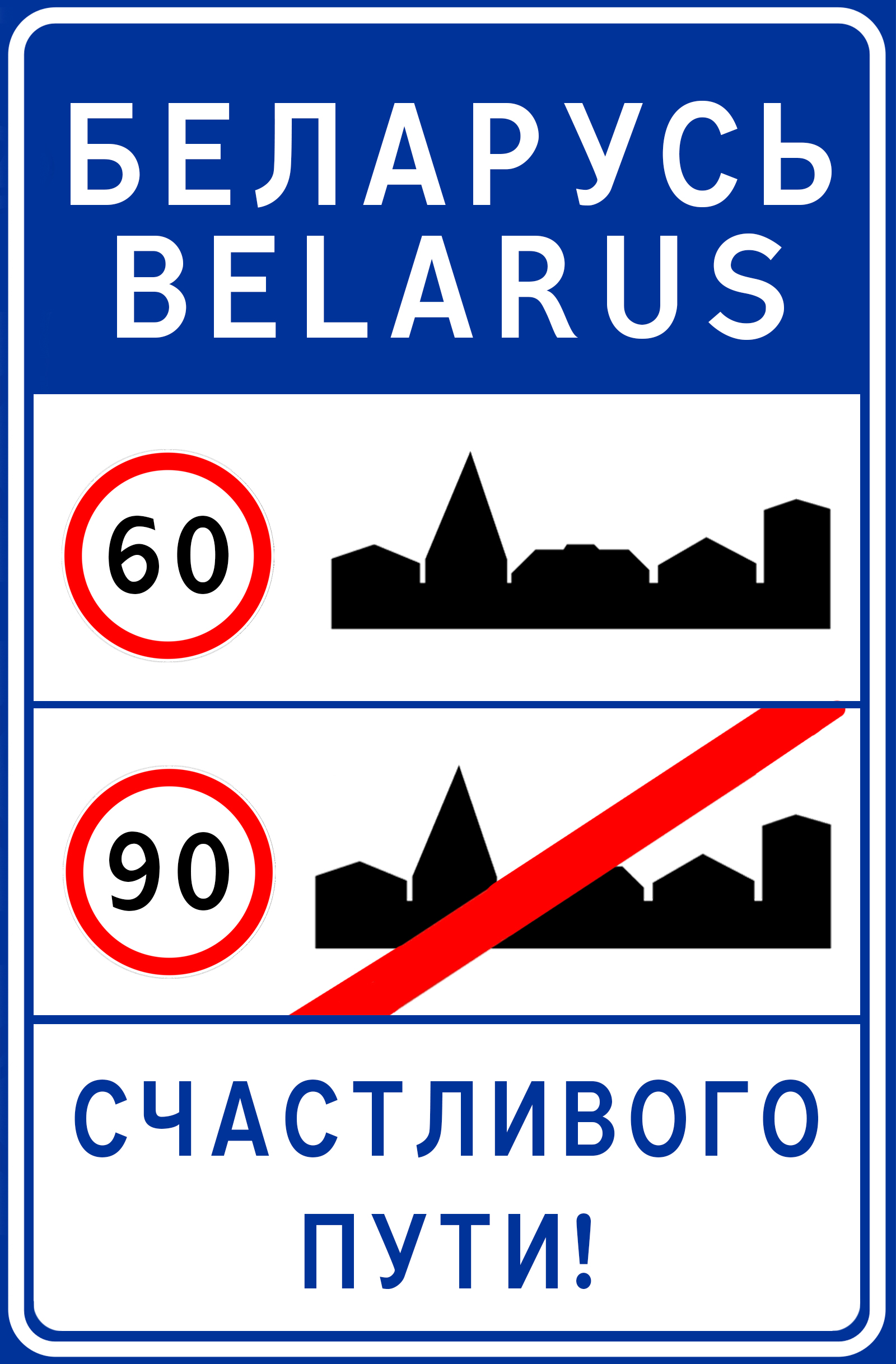

Speed limits within towns:

- 60 kilometres per hour (37 mph)
- 50 km/h for towing vehicles

Speed limits outside towns:

Cars and lorries weighing less than 3,500 kilograms (7,700 lb)

- 90 kilometres per hour (56 mph) outside towns
- 120 km/h (75 mph) on motorways

Buses and motorcycles:

- 90 km/h (56 mph)

Buses with trailers, cars with trailers, lorries with trailers, lorries weighing more than 3,500 kg (7,700 lb)7

- 70 km/h (43 mph) outside towns
- 90 km/h (56 mph) on motorways

Vehicles driving by person with less than 2 years experience and vehicles used during driving lessons:

- 70 km/h (43 mph)

Lorries used for passenger transportation:

- 60 km/h (37 mph)

Towing vehicles:

- 50 km/h (31 mph)
